Hold You Tight may refer to:

 Hold You Tight (film), a 1998 Chinese-language film
 "Hold You Tight" (song), a 1991 song by Tara Kemp
 "Hold You Tight", a 2019 song by Chen from Dear My Dear
 "Hold You Tight", a 2019 song by Diplo

See also
 Hold Me Tight (disambiguation)